Angela del Toro is a fictional character appearing in American comic books published by Marvel Comics. She is the fourth character to use the White Tiger name. She is the niece of Hector Ayala and Ava Ayala. The source of her powers is the Jade Tiger amulets she inherited from her uncle.

Publication history
Angela del Toro first appeared in the 2003 comic book Daredevil vol. 2 #58, written by Brian Michael Bendis and pencilled by Alex Maleev. Then Del Toro appeared in several issues of Daredevil vol. 2: #59, #67-70 and #77-79. She is depicted as an FBI agent amidst the accusations of Matt Murdock being Daredevil, and the arrest and eventual death of Hector Ayala who is the original White Tiger.

After becoming White Tiger, Del Toro received her own limited series in November 2006, written by Tamora Pierce and Timothy Liebe, and pencilled by the French artist Philippe Briones. The trade paperback White Tiger: A Hero's Compulsion collects the six issues of the series.

In 2010, she also appeared in "Shadowland". After this event Angela Del Toro is no longer the White Tiger. The legacy has passed to Ava Ayala.

Fictional character biography
Angela del Toro is the heir to a heroic legacy that began with the Jade Tiger, a long-lost enchanted statue from the fabled kingdom of K'un-L'un. Broken into pieces, the statue's paws and head resurfaced in America, where the Sons of the Tiger wore them as amulets that enhanced their martial arts prowess. When the Sons disbanded, their discarded amulets were discovered by Del Toro's uncle, the young Hector Ayala, who transformed into the superhuman White Tiger through their power.

Going back into action as the White Tiger, Hector was framed for murder and convicted despite the efforts of his lawyer, Matt Murdock. Hector was shot dead trying to escape, shortly before evidence emerged that proved his innocence.

Del Toro, a Federal Agent, volunteered to participate in the ongoing FBI investigation of the suspected Daredevil, Murdock. However, when Ayala's amulets were handed down to her, an overwhelmed Del Toro asked Murdock to help her decide what to do with them. Knowing the terrible cost of the vigilante lifestyle — and having seen her own partner, agent Harold Driver, killed during the Daredevil investigation —, Del Toro wanted to know why anyone would ever play super-hero. She told Murdock she was willing to quit the FBI and abandon her case if he could answer her questions.

Recognizing Del Toro's sincerity, Murdock challenged her to scale St. Catherine's Cathedral then engaged her in rooftop combat as Daredevil. Convinced of her ability, Murdock presented Del Toro with a final lesson by leading her to a robbery in progress. Subduing the robbers single-handedly, a proud Del Toro was touched by the awestruck gratitude of the shopkeeper she had rescued, and she finally began to understand her new calling. Shortly thereafter, Del Toro rescued Murdock from ex-crime lord Alexander Bont and his reluctant henchman Gladiator.

During the start of her career as a masked crime-fighter, Del Toro uncovers a government ID smuggling plot by the Yakuza and a secret organization known as the Chaeyi, and starts work at 212 Security, a private bodyguard service. As White Tiger, she attempts to stop the activities of the two criminal organizations through various team-ups with fellow superheroes including Iron Fist/Daredevil (2.0), Luke Cage, Spider-Man, and Black Widow, often facing off against King Cobra and the Yakuza that killed her partner. After ending the relationship between the Yakuza and Chaeyi, the leader of Chaeyi vows to get revenge against the White Tiger and enlists the help of Omega Red.

Del Toro is later slain by Lady Bullseye and resurrected as a Hand assassin (in the manner of Elektra Natchios). Later, she is cured of the Hand's black magic by Black Tarantula, and joins Daredevil and Black Tarantula, working within the Hand itself. Del Toro shows much doubt about what they are doing as members of the Hand.

Daredevil appoints White Tiger as one of the five 'Daimyo' of the Hand, presiding over North America and brings her with him to the Daimyo's summit in Japan where she and Bakuto, the Daimyo of South America, immediately come to odds, but Murdock stops them before they fight. Del Toro takes every opportunity to blame Bakuto for their problems in Japan. It is also revealed that Del Toro is still under the corrupting influence of the Hand.

When New York was in crisis, White Tiger ordered Black Tarantula to execute looters; he becomes confused and sees that something is wrong with Daredevil. However, White Tiger is still possessed by the Hand, and stabs Black Tarantula in the back, tossing him over a roof's edge to fall into a vehicle, leaving him for dead. Del Toro is incarcerated after this, with the White Tiger amulets passing to her aunt, Ava Ayala, Hector's teenage sister. 

Still suffering from the effects of the Hand's black magic as part of the All-New, All-Different Marvel event, Del Toro is freed from the Cellar by Maker of W.H.I.S.P.E.R., who gives her an alternate version of the White Tiger amulets from a parallel universe, restoring her powers. While in Rome, Del Toro fights Ayala, resulting in Ayala's amulets suddenly reverting to Del Toro. Afterwards, Del Toro goes on to join Maker's New Revengers with approval from the Hand, who believe that Maker's plans would benefit them. During the New Revengers' attack on the New Avengers at Avengers Base Two, Del Toro confronts Ayala. As the two White Tigers fight, Ayala manages to snatch the White Tiger amulets that Maker gave to Del Toro and destroys them enough to free Angela from the control of the White Tigers and the Hand.

Powers and abilities
The White Tiger amulets augment Angela's strength, speed, stamina, agility, reflexes, reactions, coordination, balance, and endurance to superhuman levels, and also endow her with formidable martial arts skills. The amulets may also enhance Angela's recuperative powers, as they apparently did with Hector. She has the ability to blend in with her surroundings, using the amulets to camouflage herself (however, this only works when she wears her costume, as the amulets do not affect her normal clothing).

Angela is a trained investigator, a good shot with firearms, and an experienced unarmed combatant.

Other versions

House Of M
Angela appears as part of Luke Cage's underground human resistance in the House of M crossover. When the Sentinels attack, she is one of the members who didn't get teleported out by Cloak. It is revealed that she joined Luke's "Avengers" early on and received the amulet when it was sent to her through the mail by Hector Ayala.

Collected editions
Only one collection of issues has been published to date.

References

External links
 
 White Tiger (Angela del Toro) at Marvel Wiki
 
 
 Young lit author Tamora Pierce signs exclusively with Marvel 

Characters created by Brian Michael Bendis
Characters created by Alex Maleev
Comics characters introduced in 2003
Fictional Federal Bureau of Investigation personnel
Fictional mercenaries in comics
Fictional women soldiers and warriors
Latin American superheroes
Marvel Comics characters who can move at superhuman speeds
Marvel Comics characters with superhuman strength
Marvel Comics female superheroes
Marvel Comics martial artists
Marvel Comics mutates
White Tiger (comics)